The Imperial Castle in Poznań, popularly called Zamek, "the Castle", is a palace in Poznań, Poland. It was built under German rule in 1910 by Franz Schwechten for William II, German Emperor, with substantial suggestions from the Emperor.  

Since its completion, the building has housed government offices of Germany (to 1918, and during World War II) and of Poland (1918–1939, 1945–present).

Naming
The name of this structure is misleading, as the building is a palace rather than a castle.  Another difference arises from the adjective imperial (cesarski) preferred by the Poles and royal (königliches) used by the Germans. The German name refers to William II as King of Prussia, in this function he built the palace as his provincial residence, while the Polish name refers to him as Emperor of Germany because the term "royal" is reserved for Poznań's Royal Castle, home to the early medieval Kings of Poland.

Location
The location of the castle was not accidental. After the deconstruction of the polygonal part of the Stronghold Poznań, Poznań was transformed to a residential city (Haupt- und Residenzstadt). On the new lands, Prussian authorities - who annexed the city in the Second Partition of Poland in 1793 - decided to build a new Germanic urban core, known as the "Imperial District". The projects for the new district were prepared by Josef Stübben.  Monumental buildings of the Imperial Districts surrounding the castle included:
Post Office building
headquarters of the Prussian Settlement Commission (now Collegium Maius)
Royal Academy (Königliche Akademie in Posen) (today Aula of the Adam Mickiewicz University, Collegium Minus and the Collegium Iuridicum)
City Theatre (today the opera house)
Academy of Music (Akademia Muzyczna w Poznaniu)
Evangelical-Augsburg Church of St. Paul (today Roman Catholic Church of the Holiest Savior)
Monument to Otto von Bismarck

Architecture

The castle was built in Neo-Romanesque style, considered by William to be the most "Germanic" and representing the glory of the Holy Roman Empire. The new residence was intended to reflect the control over Greater Poland by the Kingdom of Prussia and the German Empire

The main building located in the southern part of the complex has two wings: the western — the larger one — consisting of apartments, and the eastern with representative rooms. On the ground floor of the western wing were rooms of the Court Marshal, Chamberlain and other members of imperial court. On the first floor were the apartments of the Emperor and his wife. A private chapel in a Byzantine style (project of August Oetken) was located in a tower. Under the chapel, on the western side of the tower was the entrance reserved for the emperor. From the entrance, stairs lead straight to the first floor. The bedrooms of the emperor and the empress were connected by a corridor with four statues of the following rulers: Margrave Gero, Emperor Otto I, Emperor Frederick Barbarossa, and Duke Władysław II the Exile. The second floor was planned to be used by the crown prince (the so-called prince rooms). Most of rooms were connected by a foyer surrounding the inner yard.

The most impressive room of the representative wing was the Throne Room in Byzantine style. The room was lighted by huge windows from three sides, positioned between the columns and the arches. Eight statues of Holy Roman Emperors were placed under the arches. The throne, designed in an oriental style, was situated under the middle arch. Over the windows was a gallery for guests and the orchestra. The entrance to this part of the castle was from Wałowa Street (today Kościuszki Street).

The north part of the complex, facing Berlin Street (now Fredry Street), comprised service rooms, a garage, a stable, and a coach house. These structures and two wings of the main building surround a rose garden that includes a fountain modeled on the Fountain of the Lions in the Court of the Lions in the Alhambra, in Granada, Spain.

History

Construction began in 1905 (plans were ready in 1904), and five years later, on 21 August 1910, during a visit of the emperor in Poznań (called Posener Kaisertage), the architect presented the keys to the new residence to William. The total cost of the building was five million German marks, and the castle is the youngest in Europe.  William's first, and only, burgrave (Schlosshauptmann) in 1906–1918 was Polish nobleman, Count Bogdan Hutten-Czapski.

After the Greater Poland Uprising (1918–1919) and the restoration of independent Poland, the castle became the property of the Second Polish Republic. According to a decision of the Polish government in 1921, the castle became the residence of the Chief of State and later the President of Poland. The building was also used by the Ministry of Former Prussian Partition (Ministerstwo byłej Dzielnicy Pruskiej). Some rooms were also used by the University of Poznań, Związek Harcerstwa Polskiego, and other organizations.

After the invasion of Poland and annexation of Greater Poland by Nazi Germany in 1939 at the start of World War II, the German occupiers decided to transform the castle into Adolf Hitler's residence. It was also used by the administrator of the Wartheland, Arthur Greiser. According to this decision, Albert Speer prepared the project of the reconstruction, which completely changed the rooms of the castle. Most of the rooms were changed into the style of the Third Reich. The chapel was changed into the private cabinet of Hitler, with a characteristic balcony with an electric-heated floor. The cabinet was a copy of Hitler's room in the Reich Chancellery; the architectonic details of this room survived World War II and are often used in films. The Throne Room was also transformed into an audience hall. Under the castle, a bunker for 375 people was constructed. The rebuilding was stopped in 1943 due to the Germans' negativity from setbacks on the Eastern Front.

During fighting in 1945, the castle was a temporary camp for German POWs, and was later used as a barracks by the Polish People's Army. During this period, the communist government considered the demolition of the castle as a symbol of the German occupation and bourgeois style. Due to a lack of funds, only some of the German symbols were removed and the upper part of the damaged tower was demolished.

During the war, the city hall and the seat of the town authorities were destroyed. The castle was renamed "New City Hall" (Nowy Ratusz) and later transformed into a center of culture. On 6 June 1979, the castle was declared a historical monument under the protection of the law.

Today, the Throne Room is used as a cinema room; other apartments contain art galleries, a puppet theater, pubs, music clubs, and restaurants. A courtyard is often a place of concerts and outdoor movie performances during summer. The second floor is still empty and has not been renovated.

The castle is the seat of the honorary consulates of the Philippines, Guatemala, and Slovakia.

The square in front of the building is the main venue for the St. Martin's Day parade and celebrations held in Poznań annually on 11 November (see Święty Marcin).

See also
Castles in Poland
 Royal Castle, Poznań

References

Centre of Culture "Zamek
Jerzy Topolski, Lech Trzeciakowski (red) Dzieje Poznania, tom II cz. 1 1793-1918, Warszawa-Poznań 1994, Państwowe Wydawnictwo Naukowe 
Jerzy Topolski, Lech Trzeciakowski (red) Dzieje Poznania, tom II cz. 2 1918-1945, Warszawa-Poznań 1998, Państwowe Wydawnictwo Naukowe 
Franciszek Jaśkowiak, Włodzimierz Łęcki, Poznań i okolice. Przewodnik, Warszawa 1983, Sport i Turystyka 
Zbigniew Szymanowski, Marta Tomczyszyn, Poznań, Bielsko-Biała 1999, Pascal

External links

 

Government buildings completed in 1910
Buildings and structures in Poznań
Palaces in Poland
Royal residences in Poland
Prussian cultural sites
Tourist attractions in Poznań
Art Nouveau architecture in Poland
Art Nouveau government buildings